Crib Point railway station is located on the Stony Point line in Victoria, Australia. It serves the town of Crib Point, and it opened on 17 December 1889.

A former freight yard was originally located opposite of the station, while a branch line and triangle into HMAS Cerberus was located at the Up end of the station, past the Naval Base Road level crossing.

History

Crib Point station opened on 17 December 1889, when the railway line from Hastings was extended to Stony Point. Like the town itself, the station was named after a hut or 'crib' was built by fishermen in the 1850s.

In 1974, flashing light signals were provided at the Naval Base Road level crossing.

On 22 June 1981, the passenger service between Frankston and Stony Point was withdrawn and replaced with a bus service, with the line between Long Island Junction and Stony Point also closing on the same day. On 16 September 1984, promotional trips for the reopening of the line began and, on 27 September of that year, the passenger service was reinstated.

In February 1986, the former station building, which was of a timber construction, was replaced with the current passenger shelters.

HMAS Cerberus was also the location for the Mornington Railway Preservation Society, until it relocated to its current site at Moorooduc in 1997.

In 2006, No. 3 road was removed and, in October 2007, the last remaining road was removed. The removal of the roads coincided with the removal of a number of semaphore signals at the station as part of a signal upgrade on the Stony Point line.

In 2011, boom barriers were provided at the Naval Base Road level crossing.

Platforms and services

Crib Point has one platform. It is serviced by Metro Trains' Stony Point line services.

Platform 1:
  all stations services to Frankston; all stations services to Stony Point

Transport links

Ventura Bus Lines operates one route via Crib Point station, under contract to Public Transport Victoria:
 : Frankston station – Flinders

References

External links

 Melway map at street-directory.com.au

Railway stations in Melbourne
Railway stations in Australia opened in 1889
Railway stations in the Shire of Mornington Peninsula